() is a book by Nobel Prize-winning author Herta Müller. The book consists of essays about the autobiographical poetry of three writers, Theodor Kramer, Ruth Klüger and Inge Müller, who wrote under conditions of dictatorship.

Release details

References 

 
 

1996 essays
Works by Herta Müller
German-language works